The Ictaluroidea is a superfamily of catfish. As of 2000, the position of the Ictaluroidea within the Siluriformes order is not certain.

Taxonomy
This superfamily consists of the following families:

 Family Ictaluridae, native to North America
 Family Cranoglanididae

References

Siluriformes